KEOJ (101.1 FM) is a radio station licensed to Caney, Kansas, United States, broadcasting a sports format. The station is currently owned by KXOJ, Inc.

References

External links

EOJ